The Japanese Confederation of Labour (Domei) was a national trade union federation in Japan.

The federation was founded in 1964, with the merger of the All-Japan Trade Union Congress, the National Council of Government and Public Workers' Unions, and the Japanese Federation of Labour.  By 1967, it had 23 affiliates, and was the largest trade union federation in the country, just ahead of General Council of Trade Unions of Japan.  Like its rival, it sponsored candidates for the National Diet, closely linked to the Democratic Socialist Party.

In 1987, the federation merged with the Federation of Independent Unions, and the National Federation Of Industrial Organisations, to form the Japanese Trade Union Confederation.

Affiliates
In 1967, the following unions were affiliated:

Presidents
1964: Yutaka Nabasama
1968: Minoru Takita
1972: Seiji Amaike
1980: Tadanobu Usami

References

National trade union centers of Japan
Trade unions established in 1964
Trade unions disestablished in 1987